John Francis Huzvar II (August 6, 1929 – March 9, 2007) was an American football player who played three seasons in the National Football League (NFL) with the Philadelphia Eagles and Baltimore Colts. He first enrolled at the University of Pittsburgh before transferring to North Carolina State University. He attended Hershey High School in Hershey, Pennsylvania.

Early years
Huzvar played high school football at Hershey High School, receiving multiple varsity letters. He graduated in 1947.

College career
Huzvar first played college football for the Pittsburgh Panthers and later transferred to play for the NC State Wolfpack.

Professional career
Huzvar played in twelve games for the Philadelphia Eagles during the 1952 season. He then played in twenty games for the Baltimore Colts from 1953 to 1954. His career was cut short after he suffered a serious head injury while with the Colts.

Personal life
Huzvar served in the United States Marine Corps. He was later an NFL scout for free agents. He was also inducted into the Central Pennsylvania Sports Hall of Fame.

References

External links
Just Sports Stats
College stats

1929 births
2007 deaths
Players of American football from Pennsylvania
American football fullbacks
Pittsburgh Panthers football players
NC State Wolfpack football players
Philadelphia Eagles players
Baltimore Colts players
National Football League scouts
United States Marines
People from Carlisle, Pennsylvania